A19, A-19, etc. may refer to:

 A19, one of the Encyclopaedia of Chess Openings codes for the English Opening
 A19, a 2002 album by the Battlefield Band
 "A19", a song by Maxïmo Park from the Missing Songs album
 A19 light bulb, a common household bulb
 A19 road, a code used to identify a particular road in several countries
 122 mm gun M1931/37 (A-19), a Soviet field gun
 Aero A.19, a 1923 Czech fighter aircraft design
 Arrows A19, a Formula One car
 British NVC community A19 (Ranunculus aquatilis community), a plant community
 HLA-A19, a human serotype
 Saro A.19 Cloud, a 1930 British flying boat
 Subfamily A19, a rhodopsin-like receptors subfamily
 Vultee A-19, a 1939 American attack aircraft